Semat was an Ancient Egyptian Queen, who was a wife of the King Den. She was buried near him in Abydos.

Very little is known about Semat besides a stela discovered near Den's tomb in Abydos. She held the titles of 

Both of these titles were associated with queens in ancient Egypt. Semat was not the only woman identified from funerary stela. Other women whose funerary stela were found near Den's tomb are Seshemetka and Serethor.

Until the Second World War the stela was in the Egyptian Museum of Berlin, but was destroyed in the war.

References

External links 
 Francesco Raffaele: Queen Semat (English)
 List of tombs at Abydos

30th-century BC women
Queens consort of the First Dynasty of Egypt
Den (pharaoh)